Wharton Creek may refer to:

Wharton Creek (Arkansas), a stream in Arkansas
Wharton Creek (Otego Creek tributary), a stream in New York
Wharton Creek (Unadilla River tributary), a stream in New York